Entebbe (titled 7 Days in Entebbe in the U.S.) is a 2018 action thriller film directed by José Padilha and written by Gregory Burke. The film recounts the story of Operation Entebbe, a 1976 counter-terrorist hostage-rescue operation. The film stars Rosamund Pike and Daniel Brühl. It was released in the United States on 16 March 2018 and in the United Kingdom on 11 May 2018.

Plot

On 27 June 1976, Wilfried Böse and Brigitte Kuhlmann, two terrorists belonging to the Revolutionary Cells, an ultra-leftist terrorist organization, hijack Air France Flight 139, flying from Tel Aviv to Paris, during the flight's initial stopover at Athens. Elsewhere, Israeli prime minister Yitzhak Rabin and defense minister Shimon Peres are alerted of the hijacking.

During a refueling stop in Benghazi, Böse releases a female passenger who, unbeknownst to the terrorists, had pretended to suffer a miscarriage. After taking off once more, the hijackers commandeer the plane to Entebbe, Uganda on 28 June, where they unite with several terrorists from the Popular Front for the Liberation of Palestine; the two groups had jointly orchestrated the hijacking.

The next morning, the passengers are escorted by the terrorists to a dilapidated terminal, where they are greeted by   Ugandan dictator Idi Amin, who is in league with the hijackers. Concurrently, Rabin orders Peres and Gen. Motta Gur, the chief of staff of the Israel Defense Forces (IDF), to sketch a military operation aimed at rescuing the hostages. Peres suggests invading the airport, but Rabin and Gur reject it. Concurrently, the terrorists begin to segregate Israeli and non-Israeli hostages, much to Böse's fury; he compares the segregation of the hostages to the Nazi-enforced Holocaust.

Meanwhile, Rabin begins negotiations with Amin, much to the detestations of Peres, who supports a military option. On 30 June, the hijackers release 48 non-Israeli hostages, while keeping the Israeli hostages incarcerated. Concurrently, Rabin, cornered by escalating diplomatic pressure, finally concedes to initiate negotiations with the hijackers on 1 July. Consequently, the hijackers postpone the deadline of their negotiations to 4 July. Regardless of the developments, the IDF initiates preparations for a rescue mission, consisting of the Sayeret Matkal elite commando unit, headed by Lt. Col. Yoni Netanyahu. Despite favoring a diplomatic approach towards the crisis, Rabin reluctantly supports the operation.

On 3 July, with the preparations for the rescue mission - codenamed Operation Thunderbolt, finalized, Rabin convenes the Israeli cabinet for a vote regarding the status of the operation; the cabinet unanimously votes to proceed with the mission, with full endorsement from Gur. The strike force, having already departed for Uganda, is authorized to proceed with the mission.

That night, four Israeli C-130 transport aircraft carrying the strike force land discreetly at Entebbe. Almost immediately, and as an approach to maintain the element of surprise, the unit approaches the terminal in a black Mercedes limo disguised as Amin's state vehicle. However, one of the operatives prematurely opens fire, alerting the hijackers and Ugandan security personnel. The operatives storm the building, engaging both the terrorists and Ugandan soldiers. In the ensuing melee, Böse, Kuhlmann and Yoni are killed, along with the remaining terrorists and several Ugandan soldiers. With the airport secure, the strike force evacuates 102 hostages from Uganda.

Elsewhere, Peres congratulates Rabin on the success of the operation; the latter solemnly retorts that ensuring peace is the only way towards preventing further incidents between Israelis and Palestinians. The film's ending displays archival footage of the survivors' return to Israel, with brief notes about the fates of  Rabin, Peres, Yoni and the aftermath of the operation.

Cast

 Daniel Brühl as Wilfried Böse 
 Rosamund Pike as Brigitte Kuhlmann 
 Eddie Marsan as Shimon Peres
 Lior Ashkenazi as Yitzhak Rabin 
 Denis Ménochet as Jacques Le Moine
 Ben Schnetzer as Zeev Hirsch
 Angel Bonanni as Yonatan Netanyahu
 Nonso Anozie as Idi Amin
 Juan Pablo Raba as Juan Pablo
 Omar Berdouni as Faiz Jaber
 Mark Ivanir as Motta Gur 
 Peter Sullivan as Amos Eiran
 Zina Zinchenko as Sarah Mayes
 Andrea Deck as Patricia Martel 
 Brontis Jodorowsky as Captain Michel Bacos
 Vincent Riotta as Dan Shomron 
 Yiftach Klein as Ehud Barak 
 Natalie Stone as Leah Rabin
 Trudy Weiss as Dora Bloch
 Michael Lewis as Major Muki Betser
 Tomer Kapon as soldier

Production
On 11 February 2016, it was announced that José Padilha would next direct Entebbe for Working Title Films and StudioCanal, from a script by Gregory Burke. On 29 July 2016, Rosamund Pike, Daniel Brühl and Vincent Cassel joined to play the lead roles in the film, with Cassel ultimately not participating.

Principal photography on the film began on 14 November 2016 in Malta, and production also took place in the U.K. During filming, a plane landed at Malta International Airport as a result of a real hijacking and scenes of passengers exiting after negotiations had succeeded were used in the movie.

The film features extensive footage of the noted Batsheva Dance Company, dancing to a modern version of the traditional Jewish song Echad Mi Yodea. One of the characters in the film is a dancer in the troupe, and the dance is shown as the film opens and then throughout the film, intercut with portions of the narrative.

Release
The film premiered on 19 February 2018 at the 68th Berlin International Film Festival. It was released in the United States on 16 March 2018, and received a release in the United Kingdom on 11 May 2018.

Promotion
An initial trailer for Entebbe was released on 7 December 2017, using the 1971 song "I'd Love to Change the World" by the band Ten Years After.

Reception

Critical reception
The website's critical consensus reads, "7 Days in Entebbe has a worthy story to tell, but loses sight of its most compelling elements in a dull dramatization of riveting real-life events." On Metacritic, the film has a weighted average score of 49 out of 100, based on 29 critics, indicating "mixed or average reviews".

David Ehrlich of IndieWire gave the film a "C" and called it competent but pointless, saying: "When all the dust settles, we’re left right where we started, and with nothing to show for it but a fleeting reminder that peace is impossible without negotiation. It’s a lesson that history has failed to teach us, filtered through a movie that doesn’t understand why." The Chicago Sun-Timess Richard Roeper gave the film 2 out of 4 stars, writing, "All too often in 7 Days in Entebbe, primary characters on all sides of this 1970s period-piece political thriller state the obvious — and then state it again, and then have to stand around while someone else states the obvious one more time, just in case the folks in the seats have yet to grasp the stakes at hand and the dilemmas in play."

Liel Leibovitz of Tablet criticized the film's downplaying of violence, such as the final raid being "shot in infuriating slow-motion and cross-cut with a modern dance performance", writing that the lack of violence eliminates the possibility of "catharsis" and renders the film a "vapid and vacuous statement".

Historical accuracy
The film puts Yonatan Netanyahu's death much earlier in the raid than in the Netanyahu family's version of events. Director Padilha said that this placement was based on interviews with participants in the raid.
Although the production had commissioned British historian Saul David's 2015 study Operation Thunderbolt as a guide, the director opted to subordinate historical accuracy to dramatic effect in a number of scenes. Most notably, the division of the hostages and the Air France crew staying with the hostages are presented in a way that contradicts eyewitness accounts gathered by David.

Soundtrack

All cues were produced and composed by Rodrigo Amarante

Credits and personnel
 Rodrigo Amarante  – Arranger, Composer, Engineer, Primary Artist, Producer 
 John Bergin – Art Direction 
 Matthew Compton – Arranger 
 Eric Craig – A&R 
 Andrew Feinberg – A&R 
 Mark Graham – Conductor, Orchestration 
 Todd Dahl Hoff – Arranger, Engineer 
 Jake Jackson – Mixing 
 Lewis Jones – Engineer 
 Paul Katz – Executive Producer
 Samur Khouja – Engineer 
 Kirsten Lane – Music Consultant 
 Brian McNelis – Executive Producer
 David Reichardt – Engineer 
 Skip Williamson – Executive Producer

See also
 Victory at Entebbe - a 1976 American TV film about the events of Operation Entebbe
 Raid on Entebbe - a 1977 American TV film about the same event
 Operation Thunderbolt - a 1977 Israeli film
 The Last King of Scotland - a 2006 British-German film containing the raid as a subplot
 The Delta Force - a 1986 Israeli-American action thriller partially inspired by the events

References

External links
 
 
 
 
 

2018 films
2018 action drama films
2018 action thriller films
American action drama films
British action drama films
American action thriller films
British action thriller films
Cultural depictions of Idi Amin
2010s English-language films
2010s German-language films
2010s French-language films
2010s Hebrew-language films
2010s Arabic-language films
Films about aircraft hijackings
Films about battles and military operations
Films about the Israel Defense Forces
Films about terrorism in Africa
Films directed by José Padilha
Films set in 1976
Films set in Israel
Films set in Uganda
Films set in airports
Films set on airplanes
Films shot in Malta
Films shot in the United Kingdom
Operation Entebbe
Participant (company) films
Focus Features films
DreamWorks Pictures films
Working Title Films films
2018 multilingual films
American multilingual films
British multilingual films
2010s American films
2010s British films